Bübüsara Beyshenalieva (1926 – 1973), known simply as Bübüsara in her native Kyrgyzstan, was the first great Kyrgyz ballerina. She was born in the village of Vorontsovka (now Tash-Döbö), Kirghiz ASSR on 15 September 1926. She studied at the Vaganova Ballet Academy in Leningrad under the legendary Russian ballerina Agrippina Vaganova and made her debut at the famed Bolshoi Theatre in Moscow.

In 1944, after performing the part of Cholpon in the Kyrgyz ballet of the same name, Bübüsara became the prima ballerina of the Kyrgyz ballet. She performed the part of Ai-Dai in Roman Tikhomirov's 1959 screen version of Cholpon. Later in life she became a ballet teacher and professor of the Kyrgyz National Ballet School. She died on 10 May 1973.

Bübüsara appears on the Kyrgyz 5 som note, and a statue of her can be found in Bishkek near of the Kyrgyz opera and ballet theatre.

Filmography 

 1959 – Morning Star (in the part of Ai-Dai)

References

External links
Memory of the World. Central Asian sub-regional nomination form, UNESCO

1926 births
1973 deaths
20th-century ballet dancers
People's Artists of the USSR
Recipients of the Order of the Red Banner of Labour
Sixth convocation members of the Supreme Soviet of the Soviet Union
Seventh convocation members of the Supreme Soviet of the Soviet Union
Ballerinas
Kyrgyzstani artists
Kyrgyzstani ballet dancers
Soviet ballerinas
Soviet ballet dancers
Burials at Ala-Archa Cemetery